Gladstone Hamilton (23 July 1879 – 12 December 1961) was a Scottish footballer who played as an outside right in the Scottish League for Port Glasgow Athletic, Ayr, St Mirren, Morton and Queen's Park. He was capped by Scotland in 1906 and was the only serving Port Glasgow Athletic player to have been selected for international duty.

Personal life
Hamilton's elder brothers Alexander and James were also Scotland international players; historians have suggested that the success of his siblings may have been a factor in his selection, as his own club career was fairly unremarkable.

Career statistics

References

1879 births
1961 deaths
Scottish footballers
Scotland international footballers
Port Glasgow Athletic F.C. players
Queen's Park F.C. players
Brentford F.C. players
Footballers from Glasgow
St Mirren F.C. players
Ayr F.C. players
Greenock Morton F.C. players
Scottish Football League players
Southern Football League players
Association football outside forwards